Motu Patlu is an Indian animated sitcom created by Harvinder Mankkar and written by Niraj Vikram that premiered on Nickelodeon in India on 16 October 2012. The series is produced by Cosmos-Maya Studios and Viacom 18. It is adapted from the classic comic strip Lotpot. It focuses on two friends, Motu and Patlu, living in a fictional town called Furfuri Nagar, however later in the series they live in another fictional city known as Modern City. In 2019, Motu Patlu and their friends were touring in Europe. Later in 2021, Motu Patlu and their friends were started touring in Indian Places. But in 2023 Motu Patlu and their friends are back to Furfuri Nagar.

Motu Patlu is directed by Suhas Kadav and produced by Deepa Sahi and Anish J.S. Mehta. The show's theme song, "Motu Aur Patlu Ki Jodi", is composed by Sandesh Shandilya and sung by Sukhwinder Singh. It is one of the most popular children's shows in India.

Plot
The story revolves around Motu and Patlu, two friends living in Furfuri Nagar, and their daily activities. The show focuses on the two landing themselves in trouble and comical situations, later being rescued only by luck. Samosas are Motu's favourite food, and he frequently tries to steal them from a small shopkeeper who sells tea and Samosas.Chaiwala who makes the best samosas in the town. Motu is mainly the black sheep of the duo, unintentionally creating problems due to his incompetency while Patlu is the smart one that always tries to stop him. Recurring characters included Dr. Jhatka, Ghasitaram and Inspector Chingum. Ghasitaram occasionally misdirects and swindles them by making them try Dr. Jhatka's vast repertoire of quirky gadgets and gizmos. After Motu eats samosas, he temporarily gains more energy and strength than he normally has. Motu Patlu used to live in a hut, but in the newer version they live in a flat called Furfuri Apartment.

The main antagonist of the series is a criminal named "John the Don" (briefly and very famously known as John) who is accompanied by his two big but weak and dumb henchmen, Number 1 and Number 2 who steal things, steal most of the people's money and jewelry and create havoc in Furfuri Nagar. John intends to become a don, but his plans always fail due to the heroic actions of Motu and Patlu, who trap and expose him and his plans tit for tat. In some episodes John tries to harm them by stealing Dr. Jhatka's newest gadget and using it against Motu and Patlu, but they eventually manage to give John a taste of his own medicine.

In the later episodes, they started to live in Modern City, where some new characters were introduced.

Characters

Main characters
Motu: Motu is a fat man who serves as one of the central protagonists of this show. He loves to eat samosas which increase his power drastically, giving him the ability to defeat his normally superior rivals. Samosas also increase his speed, strength, vision, and intelligence, also allowing him to lift boulders and vehicles. Motu's best friend is Patlu. He often lands in trouble because of his clumsy actions. He is always looking for the easiest way to earn money, have fun and to eat a lot of samosas. Sometimes he gets over-expressive while celebrating his victory and can do something very foolish, like bringing back a pirate into the present who they had sent back to the past. He is also shown bragging about things he has never done. He is a good-natured man who wants to help others, unfortunately he can be easily fooled by them too, especially John. Patlu once said that he is not a fool, he is a simple man. Although he is not skilled in any job, he tries to work with Patlu as constables, ward boys, cleaners, delivery boys, etc. but he creates troubles and gets fired from those companies/organisations in which he and Patlu worked. He has baldness on his head but has hair next to his ears. He also has a moustache. He wears a red tunic with a blue (mostly black) vest, yellow leggings and black shoes. His talking accent is influenced by Dara Singh. He is depicted as extremely afraid of mice. In the movie, Motu Patlu in Alien World, he was separated from his father when he was 6–7 years old. His father is believed to have been abducted by aliens from the planet Axar during his search for extraterrestrial life forms in the universe. His dialogue is "Khaali pet mere dimaag ki batti nahi chalti tum hi kuch karo!"(which means "You do something, I can't think on an empty stomach!").
In the newer episodes, his tunic features maroon vertical stripes.

Patlu: Patlu is a thin man who serves as one of the show's central protagonists. He is often portrayed as the smartest guy in the city however, he often gets into a lot of trouble with Motu. He dislikes samosas but likes to read the newspapers. It is also believed that his grandfather was a boxing champion and had a recipe for procuring extraordinary strength. This is later discovered to be the case by Motu. He is not strong. He can beat John when he is alone but is beaten by strong criminals or John's goons, especially Number 1. He has a bald head and a braid. He wears a yellow tunic with orange leggings, brown-framed glasses, and brown shoes. His dialogues are "Idea!" and "Motu kuch karo!" Motu, do something!," he says it whenever Motu causes troubles.
In Modern City and Europe Tour episodes, his outfit changes to a yellow tunic with a curved blue stripe on the left and blue leggings.

Doctor Jhatka: Doctor Jhatka is an eccentric scientist. Dr. Jhatka is an engineer, a doctor, a scientist and an inventor, all skills combined together. He has a Punjabi accent, so he is referred to as Punjabi. His invention are usually very impressive but are of little use to the townspeople. Often gets someone in trouble. He drives a yellow flying car. Jhatka is known by his reduced hairline, green shirt, violet necktie, and blue jeans and olive strapped black shoes. His grandfather is shown to be a millionaire searching for the whereabouts of his grandson in Furfuri Nagar; His design is a parallel version of Motu. He sometime tests his gadgets on Motu and Patlu without telling them before hand which causes them problems. This often leads to him getting beaten up by Motu and Patlu. In some movies and almost all episodes, Motu Patlu and others beat him up for not reminding them about his gadgets, especially not to remind them of his flying helmet. In the newer episodes, he wears a yellow shirt with white floral oriental prints, a green necktie, a violet check blazer and brown pants which was soon replaced by a pair of denim trousers. Inside his lab, he wears a pair of goggles, a white shirt, a pair of turquish blue pants, and a pair of boots. He wears the same clothes as the scientists wear. He has a red flying car on the Europe trip.
Ghasitaram: Ghasitaram is cowardly and often claims to have twenty years of experience in various stuff but only a very few of the experiences are useful to others. He is referred to as Bengali; He hails from Ghatal located in West Midnapore in West Bengal. Like Dr. Jhatka, his so-called "experiences of 20 years" often land other people, especially Motu and Patlu, in trouble. However, Motu and Patlu do call on him for help in certain episodes. He is also the lab assistant of Dr. Jhatka. Ghasita also helps Dr. Jhatka with experiments and coaxing Motu and Patlu to test Dr. Jhatka's inventions. His design is a parallel version of Patlu. He wears a cobalt blue tunic, purple dhoti, dark brown vest, and shoes of the same color.
Later when they started to live in Modern City and when they started touring Europe, he wears a peach coloured tunic, an olive green vest, and brown leggings.

Inspector B. Chingum: B. Chingum is a police inspector. He believes that no criminal can escape from him, however he manages to catch them mostly by the help of Motu and Patlu. Occasionally, he also takes Dr. Jhatka's help by using his gadgets for catching bad guys. A Rajinikanth devotee with a strong South Indian accent, Chingum is a solicitous police officer. He takes pride in the fact that no criminal can ever get away. He drives both a green police motorcycle and a police jeep. Chingum is sometimes helped by two constables, Hera and Pheri. From the movie "Motu Patlu: Double Trouble", we found out that he is also married. He has a mustache that reaches the bottom of his jaw and brown silky hair that reaches his nape. Chingum wears a khaki police uniform with stars and badges decorating it and a name tag, with a police cap. He also often wears sunglasses. In the older episodes, he wears a blue handkerchief with white dots on his left wrist, which was replaced by a Smart Watch GT08 in the latest version of the show. When he says his dialogues he shoots upwards, the coconuts fall on his head and makes him fall on the ground. He can shoot coconuts from anywhere, even from Antarctica and the moon. In some episodes he is shown that he occasionally orders coconuts to fall on enemies, to stop Motu Patlu, etc. He likes to eat South Indian food such as idli, dosa, sambar, vada and coconut chutney.
He has a new police station in the new episodes. On the European tour he drives a green scooter.

Boxer: Boxer is Motu's neighbour, he is an aggressive man. Boxer wears red boxing gloves, a white tank top and red shorts with vertical yellow stripes. The text "BOXER" is written in red with an orange outline on the back of his shirt. Sometimes, he also wears a black shirt with jeans. His boxing coach is Mr. Thakur. Boxer wants to help his neighbours but becomes angry and ends up beating them up instead. He is very strong and can break through walls and punches people so hard that they go into the clouds. He is not that fast and can be fooled. He could be beaten by Motu if he eats samosas. He is shown that he is not a good parent and cannot get his son, Sunny, to sleep. In "Judwa Boxer", we find out that he also has a cowardly brother who later becomes bold enough to free him from Motu and Patlu's captivity. His real name is "Raju", as shown in the episode Motu Mobile when he calls his mother in America. He shares a good bond with Chingum and often teams up with him to beat Motu and Patlu. 
In the newer episodes, he wears a green hoodie with black stripes, blue denim trousers and green shoes.

John: John serves as the main antagonist of the show. John's ambition is to become a Don. His dialogue is "Mwah-ha-ha-ha! John banega Don,John banega Don!". But his plans always fail very badly and thus end up in him getting arrested or being taunted by other people. He says some short poems. Contrary to normal thieves, he is not afraid of Chingum but is instead afraid of Motu and Patlu. He is plump, and short in size and faces discrimination for that. He is a mastermind in thievery and also has a pistol. He can fool Motu and other people. He is also very good at mimicry and disguise. But he is less clever than Patlu. He wears a blue dress shirt with dark blue floral prints, yellow undershirt, brown belt, dark blue pants with blue cuffs, and brown shoes. He has three gold chains around his neck, J is written on his locket and eight rings on all his fingers except the thumb. He has a black mole on his left cheek. He always likes to rob money from banks and jewelry from jewellery shops. He has a van. According to the episode "Motu The Radio Jockey", John was interested in stealing since childhood, and started stealing from someone's home, then stealing chocolate from a girl, then food from restaurants, etc.
In the newer episodes, he wears a blue shirt with multiple patterns, a yellow undershirt, purple pants, and blue boots and he has a house to live in the forest where he lives. He can hide his stolen money and stolen jewellery in his own house.

Number 1: Number 1 is John's goon who serves as one of the supporting antagonists. He likes and appreciates John's short poems but John beats him up in return. He has brilliant ideas to trap Motu and Patlu but whenever he tells him John says that his idea is bad and beats him, saying that he has a better plan but repeats the same one. Though he respects John, he is always the first to get beaten by him. He wears a blue French check hat, magenta striped shirt, denim trousers, and a yellow ascot tie.
In the later episodes, he wears a green zig-zag shirt, a red ascot tie, a red beret, and dark brown shoes.

Number 2: Number 2 is John's goon who rarely speaks. He has a dark mark on his one eye and a bandage on his oversized nose. However, in the new version, there is no dark mark on one of his two eyes and no bandage on his nose. He has dark brown hair, wears a cyan striped shirt, aquamarine ascot tie, and brownish-orange pants.
In the later version, he wears a purple striped shirt, a light green ascot tie, green pants, and red shoes.

Chaiwala: Chaiwala owns a tea shop near Motu's house but his real home is never revealed. He makes Motu's favorite samosas and Patlu's favorite tea in the city, which Motu steals from the shop in the older episodes. Although Chaiwala does not like his food being stolen, he occasionally rewards Motu by exempting him from paying the money Motu owes him or even promising him more free samosas when he saves him from other residents of Furfuri Nagar. Motu sometimes gets beaten up for not paying Chaiwala. He wears a white undershirt and lungi with a towel over his neck, which he occasionally uses to wipe off his sweat.
Later in Modern City, he wears a blue-gold chef's hat and uniform and he has a new tea shop.

Recurring
Khopdi: Khopdi is a goon in season 10, 11 and 12, who always tries to defeat Motu Patlu. He was first introduced in the movie "Motu Patlu Dino Invasion". He is the Don of Modern City, his vehicle is an ambulance. Khopdi has more assistants but their names have not been mentioned. Sometimes Khopdi stands on the ambulance while one of his two assistants drives the ambulance. The episode he first appeared in was called Apna Hotel. He also appeared in some of Motu Patlu's Europe Tour Episodes.
Pappu-Haddi: They are two assistants of Khopadi.
Skull: He is the elder brother of Khopdi and made his first appearance in the movie "Motu Patlu Dino Invasion" as a famous hunter of Africa. He likes to catch animals. He also appeared in some of Motu Patlu's Europe Tour Episodes.
Commissioner Bubblegum: Commissioner Bubblegum is Chingum's father and the police commissioner of Furfuri Nagar and adjoining villages. He once got impressed with Motu and Patlu and even recruited them in the police as Havaldars, but when he discovered they were less capable than he thought, he became annoyed with them and fired them from the police force. He recently has moved to Modern City and has appeared in Motu Patlu's Modern City's Episodes.
Hera Singh: Hera is Chingum's first Hawaldars. He always tells Chingum, "Aap to tope ho, Hindustan ki hope ho", which means "You are a fighter, India's greatest hope".
Pheri Lal: Pheri is Chingum's second Hawaldar. He always remarks, "You are great sir, but born little late sir".
Sabziwali: Sabziwali sells the best vegetables in the whole Furfuri Nagar. Motu can be troublesome to her too at times and also owes her some money. She has got a fiery temper and can also punish Chingum at times whenever his chases harm her vegetables in some or other way. She wears a green saree over a black blouse.
Mayor Singh: He is the Mayor of Furfuri Nagar, He wears a coat and a white shirt with the coat coloured Pant. He sometimes has a Mayor named band on his coat.
Munni: Munni is Motu's sister who is shown very rarely in the episodes.
Chotu: Chotu is Motu's nephew(Munni’s son). He wears a green T-shirt with a pink pant. Sometimes, he wears a brown shirt with yellow pants.
Badman: He is John's twin brother who also has two goons like John. In the episode Dance Competition, he has a black mole on his left cheek like John. In the episode Cross Connection, he does not have a mole.
Don Johnny: Johnny is John's elder brother. In the episode Motu Patlu Acchey Insaan, he is seen to be caught. In the episode John Ka Bhai Johnny, he is seen to be very rich.
Virus Scientist: Virus is a scientist, He always invents something for John. In return, he asks John for money but John somehow fools him and makes his run away. John uses his gadgets as a trial on him and puts Virus in trouble.
Additional characters include Chingum's mother: Amma, Chingum's wife: Dharti, and Chingum's uncle: Troublegum.

Location
The series is set in a fictional town of Furfuri Nagar of India. It is a peaceful yet glamorous small town, simultaneously noble and squalid, adjoined by a river with a few shops, a large market area, a bus depot, a cluster of single-storeyed houses, temples, and a few recreational places. The town has three or more banks, three or more jewellery shops, Furfuri Nagar Police Station, Chingum's house, Boxer's house, Motu Patlu's house, Chaiwala's stall, Furfuri Nagar Central Jail, Furfuri Nagar Bus Stand, John's den, Dr. Jhatka's laboratory and house and Ghasitaram's house. There are a few villages and a few neighbouring cities around, such as Kamalpur, Sursuri Nagar and Modern City. Despite being a small town it has its own airport. It is not clearly mentioned where the town is exactly located, but most of the vehicles carry license plate numbers starting with "MH", which stands for the state of Maharashtra. The local police force wears uniforms of the Maharashtra Police.

However, in the later episodes, they had moved to Modern City for unknown reasons. A quick trailer showcasing new episodes mentions the differences in their new setting.

In the later episodes, they were on a trip to countries of Europe. Some European countries and cities they have visited include Pisa, Italy; Rome, Italy; Tuscany, Italy; London, England and Paris, France. They also visited Germany's Berlin, Switzerland's Top of Europe, Russia's St. Petersburg, England's Salisbury and Switzerland's Jungfraujoch.

But now in the later episodes, they are on a trip to India. Firstly, it streamed digitally on Voot Kids on 12 April 2021. It started airing on Nickelodeon 10 May 2021. Some Indian cities of monuments they have visited include Taj Mahal (Agra), Gateway Of India (Mumbai), Victoria Memorial (Kolkata), Qutub Minar (New Delhi), Hawa Mahal (Jaipur), Tea Plantation (Assam), Backwater (Kerala), Charminar (Hyderabad), Bandra-Worli Sea Link (Mumbai), Rock Garden (Chandigarh), Elephanta Caves (Mumbai), Bekal Fort (Kerala), Red Fort (New Delhi) and Howrah Bridge (Kolkata) and many more.

Production

Music
The music featured in the series and film is written by Sandesh Shandilya, an Indian film composer. The theme song of the series, "Motu Aur Patlu Ki Jodi", is written by Gulzar and sung by Bollywood singer Sukhwinder Singh in Hindi.

Movies

Episodes

Furfuri Nagar's Episodes

The Rest Furfuri Nagar's Episodes

Modern City's Episodes

Motu Patlu's Europe Tour

Description
In Motu Patlu's Europe Tour they had visited many countries and in the cities of those countries, in the capital cities, and in many places in those countries such as the Leaning Tower of Pisa, Eiffel Tower, Big Ben, Colosseum, Tower Bridge of London, Rome, Tuscany, London, Paris, Jungfraujoch in Switzerland and London. Motu Patlu's Europe Tour has 100+ episodes aired on Nickelodeon.  Their European tour also includes four movies of Motu Patlu, "Motu Patlu in the Game of Zones", "Motu Patlu The Superheroes Vs. Alien Ghost", "Motu Patlu's Dangerous Road Trip In Switzerland" and "Motu Patlu Vs Dr. Destroyer".

Europe Tour's Episodes

Motu Patlu's Indian Tour

Description
In Motu Patlu's Indian Tour they have visited many cities and have visited many famous monuments in those cities like Taj Mahal (Agra), Gateway Of India (Mumbai), Victoria Memorial (Kolkata), Qutub Minar (New Delhi), Hawa Mahal (Jaipur), Tea Plantation (Assam), Backwater (Kerala), Charminar (Hyderabad), Bandra-Worli Sea Link (Mumbai), Rock Garden (Chandigarh), Elephanta Caves (Mumbai), Bekal Fort (Kerala), Red Fort (New Delhi) and Howrah Bridge (Kolkata) and many more. Motu Patlu's Indian tour has more than 160 episodes aired on Nickelodeon and put on Voot Kids. The Indian tour also includes 5 movies of Motu Patlu, "The Secret Mission Of Motu Patlu", "Motu Patlu - Planet Of No Return", "Motu Patlu In Toy World", "Motu Patlu & The Secret Of Devil’s Heart" and “Motu Patlu And The Terror Of Giant Beasts. All the have premiered on Voot Kids first and then have aired on Nickelodeon India Television Channel except “The Secret Mission Of Motu Patlu” as it came on Voot Kids after being aired on Nickelodeon India Television Channel.

Indian Tour's Episodes

Back To Furfuri Nagar's Episodes

Special Festive Episodes 

Diwali Special Episodes 

Christmas Special Episodes

Merchandising and promotion 
Since the inception of the television series, its creators, Lotpot magazine, Maya Digital Studios and Nickelodeon India are aggressively promoting its merchandising, the series products and tie-ups.

In March 2014, Nick India tied up with the Yellow Diamond chips brand for promotion of its products across various media. In November 2014 a major deal was signed by Horlicks for promotion of its brand with the series's characters in its marketing advertisements.

Broadcast history

References

External links 
 
 Official website
 Motu Patlu-Available On Voot Kids
 Inspector Chingum
 Guddu The Great

 

 
2012 Indian television series debuts
Animated satirical television series
2010s satirical television series
2020s satirical television series
Indian children's animated comedy television series
Animated children's television sitcoms
Nickelodeon (Indian TV channel) original programming
Television shows based on comics
Hindi-language Nickelodeon original programming
Television shows based on comic strips
Indian satire